Pillaka (Quechua for a two-colored llawt'u, also spelled Pillaca) is a mountain in the Cordillera Negra in the Andes of Peru which reaches a height of approximately . It is located in the Ancash Region, Aija Province, Succha District, and in the Huarmey Province, Huayan District.

References

Mountains of Peru
Mountains of Ancash Region